Eskandari-ye Baraftab (also Romanized as Eskandarī-ye Barāftāb; also known as Eskandarī and Īskandarī) is a village in Zayandeh Rud-e Shomali Rural District, in the Central District of Faridan County, Isfahan Province, Iran. At the 2006 census, its population was 2,138, in 519 families.

References 

Populated places in Faridan County